Weybourne is a small village in Surrey, England. It lies on the outskirts of Farnham, Surrey  and borders onto Aldershot, Hampshire.

Geography
Weybourne lies to the northeast of Farnham, bordering the villages of Hale, Heath End and Badshot Lea as well as the town of Aldershot to the north. The village centres around the crossroads of Weybourne Road (the B3007) and Upper and Lower Weybourne Lane. Its northern extent is demarcated by the Blackwater River, the ancient border of Surrey and Hampshire. The source of this river is within the Rowhill Copse Nature Reserve which can be accessed via a number of points from Weybourne. To the east, the village borders Badshot Lea and is bounded by the train line from Aldershot to Farnham. The western boundary with the villages of Heath End and Hale is less clear, but the district ward boundary between the wards of Farnham Weybourne & Badshot Lea and Farnham Hale & Heath End does run between the B3007 (Weybourne Road) and the A325 (Farnborough Road) crossing Upper Weybourne Lane. In the south, Monkton Lane running from Hale to Badshot Lea crosses Weybourne Road and where it does so lies the boundary into Farnham proper from Weybourne.

History
Weybourne appears on the 1816 Ordnance Survey First Series map as Weyburn and is limited to a few buildings to the south and east of the Weybourne Road Weybourne Lane crossroads. The buildings to the south of that crossroad are dominated by Weybourne House, a grade II* listed building dated at 1724. The name of the village may derive from that of the house, which in turn is made up of two elements: "Wey", being the name of the river running through Farnham, and 'bourne" or "burn" meaning 'stream'. Weybourne House is the birthplace of John Henry Knight (born 1847), the pioneering motorist and auto-mobile manufacturer, who lived there until his family moved to Barfield in Runfold, Farnham.

Politics

Local
Weybourne has a village hall but has no civil parish. Weybourne is represented, along with Badshot Lea, at Waverley Borough Council by two councillors: Daniel Hunt and Mark Merryweather (both Liberal Democrat). Of the 81 single-member electoral divisions of Surrey County Council Weybourne is in Farnham North, represented by Catherine Powell (Farnham Residents).

National
Weybourne is part of the South West Surrey constituency.

Religion
Weybourne has no formal places of worship. The village is within the Church of England Parish of Badshot Lea and Hale which in turn is in the Deanery of Farnham, part of the Diocese of Guildford.

Past Residents

John Henry Knight - Pioneering motorist and auto-mobile manufacturer; lived in Weybourne House, before moving to Barfield in Runfold, Farnham. He designed and built "The first petroleum carriage for two people made in England" 

Vera Lynn - singer; as a child she stayed with an aunt in the village every summer until the start of World War II.

Jessie Matthews - actress; once lived in Weybourne Road, Weybourne.

Jonny Wilkinson - Former English Rugby Union Footballer and World Cup winner - attended William Cobbett Junior School and Weybourne Infant School.

George Mesher (1860 - 1938) - architect and contractor who built many edifices in Victoria, British Columbia.

Demographics and Housing
The central village comprises housing from the mid to late Victorian period, mainly along Weybourne Road. This includes The Old School House, built originally in the late nineteenth century as a Sunday School, then used as a local school. The school bell is still intact, although moved to the side of the building. The School House is now a private dwelling.  There is Local Authority Housing from the 1940s and 1950s off Upper Weybourne Lane, and additional private housing was built in the late 1960s and early 1970s off Lower Weybourne Lane and Upper Weybourne Lane. Housing has been added sporadically since, with residential flats and some smaller housing developments in the 1980s and early 1990s. Towards the edge of the village, near the border with Aldershot, the housing changes in character with housing from the 1920s and 1930s being more prevalent.

Amenties and Public Facilities

Educational
The village has a number of schools. 
William Cobbett Primary School was formed in 2015 with the merger of William Cobbett Junior School (opened in 1974) and Weybourne Infant School (originally opened in 1972 as Weybourne County First School). 
 All Hallows Catholic School - a mixed, voluntary-aided comprehensive secondary school and Sixth Form. The most recent Ofsted overall rating placed the school in the top category, outstanding.
 Farnham Heath End School

Sports and open spaces
Weybourne is the home of a number of sports clubs and facilities including:

 David Lloyd Gym
 Nuffield Gym
 Weybourne Recreational Ground - sports facilities on offer include public Football pitches and a pavilion (utilised by Badshot Lea Football Club) and a tennis court.
 Farnham RFU club (between Weybourne and Badshot Lea)
 Farnham United Football Club (between Weybourne and Badshot Lea)

In addition two nature reserves are in whole or in part within the village:
 Weybourne Local Nature Reserve
 Rowhill Copse Nature Reserve

Shops other amenities
 Weybourne Village Hall
 Sub-Post Office
 Premier (Newsagents)
 Bakery (use to be the flower shop)

Public Houses
 The Running Stream
 The Elm Tree

Notes

References

External links
 Weybourne Nature Area

External links

Villages in Surrey
Borough of Waverley